Patmati (also Romanized as Patmatī) is a village in Nazil Rural District, Nukabad District, Khash County, Sistan and Baluchestan Province, Iran. At the 2006 census, its population was 125, in 29 families.

References 

Populated places in Khash County